The 1934–35 Yorkshire Cup was the 27th occasion on which the Yorkshire Cup competition had been held. For the first and only time, the Yorkshire Cup final required two replays to sort the teams and decide the  winners, Leeds eventually winning the trophy by beating Wakefield Trinity by the score of '13-0-(HT unknown) in a second replay.

Competition and results  

This season there were no junior/amateur clubs taking part, no new entrants and no "leavers" and so the total of entries remained the  same at fifteen.

This in turn resulted in one bye in the first round.

Round 1 
Involved  7 matches (with one bye) and 15 clubs

Round 1 - replays  
Involved  1 match and 2 clubs

Round 2 – quarterfinals 
Involved 4 matches and 8 clubs

Round 2 - replays  
Involved  1 match and 2 clubs

Round 3 – semifinals  
Involved 2 matches and 4 clubs

Final 
The final was played at Crown Flatt, Dewsbury, now in West Yorkshire, with an attendance of 22,598, receipts were £1,529 and a final score of  5-5,

Final - First Replay  

The first replay was at Fartown, with an attendance of 10,500, receipts of £745 and a final score of  2-2.

Final - Second Replay  

The second replay was played at Parkside, with an attendance of 19,304, receipts of £1,327 and a final score of 13-0. Altogether a total of around 52,500 people paid over £3,500 to watch the three matches. This was Leeds' fourth of six victories in a period of ten years, during which time they won every Yorkshire Cup final in which they appeared. Also the  first of two consecutive victories which they would enjoy.

Teams and scorers 

Scoring - Try = three (3) points - Goal = two (2) points - Drop goal = two (2) points

The road to success

Notes and comments 
1 * This was Bradford Northern's first Yorkshire Cup match at their new stadium, Odsal
2 * The  attendance is given as 22,598 by RUGBYLEAGUEproject,  the  Rothmans Rugby League Yearbook of 1991-92 and 1990-91  but 22500 by "100 Years of Rugby. The History of Wakefield Trinity 1873-1973"
3 * The  receipts are given as £1,529 by  the Rothmans Rugby League Yearbook of 1991-92 and 1990-91  but £1,526 by "100 Years of Rugby. The History of Wakefield Trinity 1873-1973"
4 * Crown Flatt was the home ground of Dewsbury from 1898 to 1991. The ground was becoming dilapidated, but a deliberately set fire which completely destroyed the recently renovated stand, together with all the clubs historical records, forced a move to a new ground. The final capacity is unknown but was much less than the record attendance of 26,584, set on 30 October 1920 for a second round Yorkshire Cup match to watch Dewsbury bear Halifax 3-2
5 * Fartown was the home ground of Huddersfield from 1878 to the end of the 1991-92 season to Huddersfield Town FC's Leeds Road stadium, and then to the McAlpine Stadium in 1994. Fartown remained as a sports/Rugby League ground but is now rather dilapidated, and is only used for staging amateur rugby league games.
Due to lack of maintenance, terrace closures and finally major storm damage closing one of the stands in 1986, the final ground capacity had been reduced to just a few thousands although the record attendance was set in a Challenge cup semi-final on 19 April 1947 when a crowd of 35,136 saw Leeds beat Wakefield Trinity 21-0
6 * The  attendance is given as 19,304 by RUGBYLEAGUEproject,  the  Rothmans Rugby League Yearbook of 1991-92 and 1990-91  but 19,000 by "100 Years of Rugby. The History of Wakefield Trinity 1873-1973"
7 * Parkside was the home ground of Hunslet from 1888 to 1973. The club were struggling financially when in 1971 fire destroyed the stand, greatly reducing the ground attendance capacity, the record for which stood at the 24,700 for a third round Challenge Cup match in 1924. After the fire the directors sold the ground and wound up the club.

General information for those unfamiliar 
The Rugby League Yorkshire Cup competition was a knock-out competition between (mainly professional) rugby league clubs from  the  county of Yorkshire. The actual area was at times increased to encompass other teams from  outside the  county such as Newcastle, Mansfield, Coventry, and even London (in the form of Acton & Willesden.
The Rugby League season always (until the onset of "Summer Rugby" in 1996) ran from around August-time through to around May-time and this competition always took place early in the season, in the Autumn, with the final taking place in (or just before) December (The only exception to this was when disruption of the fixture list was caused during, and immediately after, the two World Wars)

See also 
1934–35 Northern Rugby Football League season
Rugby league county cups

References

External links
Saints Heritage Society
1896–97 Northern Rugby Football Union season at wigan.rlfans.com
Hull&Proud Fixtures & Results 1896/1897
Widnes Vikings - One team, one passion Season In Review - 1896-97
The Northern Union at warringtonwolves.org

Yorkshire Cup
RFL Yorkshire Cup